Ukraine competed at the 2022 World Aquatics Championships in Budapest, Hungary from 18 June to 3 July.

Medalists

Artistic swimming 

Ukraine entered 11 artistic swimmers.

Women

Diving

Ukraine entered 9 divers.

Men

Women

Mixed

Open water swimming

Ukraine entered 3 open water swimmers ( 1 male  and 2 female)

Men

Women

Swimming

Ukraine entered 10 swimmers.
Men

Women

 Legend: (*) = Swimmers who participated in the heat only.

References

Nations at the 2022 World Aquatics Championships
2022
World Aquatics Championships